Scholze is a German surname. Notable people with the surname include:

Georg Scholze (1897–1945), German general during World War II
Johann Sigismund Scholze (1705–1750), Silesian music anthologist and poet
Peter Scholze (born 1987), German mathematician

See also
Scholze–Sayles House, a historic house in Pawtucket, Rhode Island

German-language surnames